Diego Valentín Rodríguez Alonso (born 13 June 2001) is a Uruguayan professional footballer who plays as a left-back for Peñarol.

Career
Rodríguez is a youth academy graduate of Peñarol. He made his professional debut for the club on 16 January 2021 in 1–1 draw against Cerro. He scored his first goal on 15 July 2021 in a 2–1 Copa Sudamericana win against Nacional.

Career statistics

Honours
Peñarol
 Uruguayan Primera División: 2021

References

External links
 

2001 births
Living people
Footballers from Montevideo
Association football defenders
Uruguayan footballers
Uruguayan Primera División players
Peñarol players